A system is said to be transient or in a transient state when a process variable or variables have been changed and the system has not yet reached a steady state. The time taken for the circuit to change from one steady state to another steady state is called the transient time.

Examples

Chemical Engineering
When a chemical reactor is being brought into operation, the concentrations, temperatures, species compositions, and reaction rates are changing with time until operation reaches its nominal process variables.

Electrical engineering 
When a switch is flipped in an appropriate electrical circuit containing a capacitor or inductor, the component draws out the resulting change in voltage or current (respectively), causing the system to take a substantial amount of time to reach a new steady state.

We can define a transient by saying that when a quantity is at rest or in uniform motion and a change in time takes place , changing the existing state , a transient has taken place.

When a SCR (four-layer PNPN Device) is switched on we have the problem of transients occurring as a result of high values of current and voltage oscillating around the point before normal levels are obtained again. Filtering can prevent damage to SCR by means of LC filters, zener diodes, trans-zorps, and varistors.

See also

Attractor
Carrying capacity
Control theory
Dynamical system
Ecological footprint
Economic growth
Engine test stand
Equilibrium point
List of types of equilibrium
Evolutionary economics
Growth curve
Herman Daly
Homeostasis
Lead-lag compensator
Limit cycle
Limits to Growth
Population dynamics
Race condition
Simulation
State function
Steady state
Steady state economy
Steady State theory
Systems theory
Thermodynamic equilibrium
Transient modelling
Transient response

References

Chemical process engineering
Electrical engineering
Systems theory
Control theory